Lost Transmissions is a 2019 drama film written and directed by Katharine O'Brien. It stars Simon Pegg, Juno Temple, and Alexandra Daddario. It premiered at the Tribeca Film Festival on April 28, 2019 ati was released on March 13, 2020 by Gravitas Ventures.

Plot 

The film centers on Hannah (Juno Temple), a shy songwriter, who discovers that her friend, respected record producer Theo Ross (Simon Pegg), has lapsed on his medication for schizophrenia. Hannah rallies a group of friends to help commit Theo to a psychiatric hospital, chasing him as he outruns his colorful delusions through the glamour and grit of Los Angeles.

Cast

Production

Casting 
In April 2017, it was announced Simon Pegg had joined the cast, with Katharine O'Brien directing from a screenplay she wrote.

Filming 
On August 2, 2018, the last day of filming, it was announced that Juno Temple, Alexandra Daddario, Tao Okamoto, Bria Vinaite, Jamie Harris, Danny Ramirez, Rebecca Hazelwood, Reef Karim, Daisy Bishop, Grant Harvey, Jacob Loeb, Jonathan Ohye, Nana Ghana, and Robert Schwartzman had joined the cast of the film.

Release 
Lost Transmissions had its world premiere at the Tribeca Film Festival on April 28, 2019. The film was also screened at the American Film Festival on November 6, 2019, and at the Whistler Film Festival on December 8, 2019. Shortly after, Gravitas Ventures acquired distribution rights to the film and released it on March 13, 2020.

Critical response 
The website's critics consensus reads, "Lost Transmissions finds itself occasionally stranded despite solid performances from Simon Pegg and Juno Temple." Metacritic, which uses a weighted average, assigned the film a score of 51 out of 100 based on 8 critics, indicating "mixed or average reviews".

After its Tribeca premiere, John DeFore of The Hollywood Reporter gave a positive review by stating "Lost Transmissions gave a sympathetic and appropriately downtempo look at a musician's mental illness. The film tells its story without engaging with foolish cliches about creativity and madness." Joey Magidson of Hollywood News also gave a positive review by stating "Simon Pegg and Juno Temple have never been better, exercising new acting muscles and causing you to re-evaluate what each is capable of." Kristy Strouse of Film Inquiry gave another positive review by stating "Lost Transmissions really finds its identity in the softer moments between our two leads, as the heartbreak comes to the surface and they acknowledge their own (and each other's) struggles." Andy Howell of Film Threat felt that viewers who "might see Lost Transmissions just for Simon Pegg will come away with a deeper sense of what schizophrenia is".

Conversely, Alex Papaioannou of Popaxiom gave a mixed review by stating "Lost Transmissions takes the form of a bright spotlight that is necessary to expose harsh realities, and hopefully promote change. Unfortunately, there are times when these examples come off as misguided or played for laughs, which is upsetting whether intentional or not. This debut is a film about mental health and music, and while an important subject matter, it doesn't necessarily hit all the marks that it should. Still, Simon Pegg is absolutely fantastic and confirms his serious acting skills." Owen Gleiberman of Variety also gave a mixed review by stating "Lost Transmissions is a murky and unfocused journey, set in a Los Angeles that looks as sodden as London on an overcast day."

Emily Sears of Birth.Movies.Death. gave a negative review by stating "The plot of Lost Transmissions limits the performances, seesawing back and forth too often between Theo manipulating the system and Hannah being too stubborn to give up."

Awards
The film won three awards at the 2020 Prague Independent Film Festival — Grand Prix, Best Actor (Simon Pegg) and Best Actress (Juno Temple).

References

External links 
 

2019 drama films
2019 films
American drama films
American independent films
Films about schizophrenia
Films scored by Hugo Nicolson
2010s English-language films
2010s American films